Harmankaya Nature Park is a nature park located in Termal district of Yalova Province, northwestern Turkey.

The area covering , which formerly had a registered recreational area status, was declared a nature park by the Ministry of Environment and Forest on July 11, 2011.

Ecosystem 
Flora
The protected area is covered mainly by beech (Fagus orientalis). Other flora of the park are the trees silver linden (Tilia argentea), sweet chestnut (Castanea sativa), common hornbeam (Carpinus betulus), Hungarian oak (Quercus frainetto), sessile oak (Quercus petraea) and Turkey oak (Quercus cerris), as well as the flowering plants greater snowdrop (Galanthus elwesii), toothpickweed (Ammi visnaga), Italian arum (Arum italicum), bellflower (Campanula lyrata), peach-leaved bellflower (Campanula persicifolia), bladder campion (Silene vulgaris), leafy goosefoot (Chenopodium foliosum), nettle-leaved goosefoot (Chenopodium murale), charlock mustard (Sinapis arvensis), whitetop (Lepidium draba), stinkwort (Inula graveolens), coltsfoot (Tussilago farfara), golden marguerite (Anthemis tinctoria), common wormwood (Artemisia vulgaris), spear thistle (Cirsium vulgare), musk thistle (Carduus nutans), yellow star-thistle (Centaurea solstitialis) and many others.

Fauna
Observed fauna are the mammals gray wolf, jackal, fox, wild boar, the amphibian frog, the reptiles tortoise, lizard, snake and some bird and songbird species.

References

Nature parks in Turkey
Protected areas established in 2011
2011 establishments in Turkey
Tourist attractions in Yalova Province
termal, Yalova